Jadval-e Ghureh-ye Nareh Gah (also Romanized as Jadval-e Ghūreh-ye Nareh Gāh; also known as Jadval-e Ghūreh-ye Bālā and Jadval-e Ghūreh-ye ‘Olyā) is a village in Sarrud-e Jonubi Rural District, in the Central District of Boyer-Ahmad County, Kohgiluyeh and Boyer-Ahmad Province, Iran. At the 2006 census, its population was 76, in 14 families.

References 

Populated places in Boyer-Ahmad County